Benjamin Mouton (born 10 October 1948) is a French architect. He is architecte en chef des monuments historiques and until 2013 was inspector general of historic monuments.

Life
The son of a physician, Benjamin Mouton was born in the 15th arrondissement of Paris and studied in Georges-Henri Pingusson's studio at the école nationale supérieure des beaux-arts then in the UP6 à l'école nationale supérieure d'architecture de Paris.

Roles

Awards 
Benjamin Mouton is a knight of the Légion d'honneur, officer of the Ordre national du Mérite and commander of the Ordre des Arts et des Lettres. He is also commander of the Ordre du Mérite culturel and honorary member of the Romanian national commission for historic monuments.

References

1948 births
Living people
20th-century French architects
21st-century French architects
Architects from Paris